Youghal International College (YIC) is an international school in Youghal, County Cork, Republic of Ireland. It serves ages 6 through 18. The Spanish Ministry of Education recognises the school, which is a branch of the Centro Afuera in Madrid.

The ministry classifies it as a "Centro Privado Español en el Extranjero".

The teachers are native Spanish speakers.

References

External links

  Youghal International College

International schools in the Republic of Ireland
Spanish international schools in Europe
Secondary schools in County Cork
Buildings and structures in Youghal